András Hegedűs (12 July 1950 – 20 February 2022) was a Hungarian orienteering competitor. He received a bronze medal in the relay event at the 1972 World Orienteering Championships in Jičín, together with Zoltán Boros, János Sőtér and Géza Vajda.

References

1950 births
2022 deaths
Hungarian orienteers
Male orienteers
Foot orienteers
World Orienteering Championships medalists
Sportspeople from Budapest